Mr. Mick is the fifth studio album released by the British rock group Stackridge in 1976. It originally was released in the UK by The Rocket Record Company, and its catalogue number was ROLL 3. This was the first album by Stackridge to go unreleased in the United States.

Overview
The album was produced by Andy Cresswell-Davis (known simply as Andy Davis on this recording) and engineered by Denny Bridges.  It was recorded at Ramport Studios in South London and mixed at AIR Studios. Pete Gage produced the basic track on "The Dump" and "Steam Radio Song". Some of the keyboards for the album were played by Dave Lawson of the band Greenslade.

The version of Mr. Mick that was released in 1976 had many changes ordered by the group's label UK label.  Although supported with airplay from BBC Radio 1's John Peel amongst others it was less successful than expected. The many difficulties the group experienced during this time contributed to their break-up not long after the release of Mr. Mick.

In 2000, DAP Records finally released the album in the form the group originally intended: it was entitled The Original Mr. Mick.  In 2006 Angel Air released a 2-disc set containing both albums in their entirety.

Track listing
"Hold Me Tight" (John Lennon, Paul McCartney) – 3:33
"Breakfast with Werner von Braun" (Andy Davis) – 4:05
"Steam Radio Song" (Davis, Steve Augarde) – 3:34
"The Dump" (Davis) – 1:47
"Save a Red Face" (Mutter Slater, Augarde) – 3:24
"The Slater's Waltz" (Slater, Augarde) – 4:33
"Coniston Water" (Slater) – 5:22
"Hey Good Looking" (Davis, Crun Walter) – 4:16
"Fish in a Glass" (Davis, Walter) – 7:18

Track listing: "The Original Mr. Mick"

"Hey! Good Looking" (Davis, Walter) – 4:30
"Breakfast With Werner Von Braun" (Davis) – 3:45
"Mr Mick's Walk" (Davis, Augarde) – 3:55
"Mr Mick's Dream" (Davis, Augarde) – 2:10
"Save A Red Face" (Slater, Augarde) – 3:25
"The Steam Radio Song" (Davis, Augarde) – 3:20
"The Slater's Waltz" (Slater, Augarde) – 4:10
"Hazy Dazy Holiday" (Slater) – 2:05
"Coniston Water" (Slater) – 4:50
"Can Inspiration Save The Nation?" (Davis, Walter) – 2:15
"Mr Mick's New Home"(Slater, Davis, Augarde) – 3:30
"Fish In A Glass" (Davis, Walter) – 7:50

Personnel
Andy Cresswell-Davis - guitar, keyboards, vocals
Mike "Mutter" Slater - flute, keyboards, vocals and narration
Keith Gemmell - saxophones, clarinet
Jim "Crun" Walter - bass
Peter Van Hooke - drums
Dave Lawson - keyboards

Additional personnel
Ray Russell - guitar
Joanna Karlin - vocal on "The Slater's Waltz"

Production
 Denny Bridges - engineering
John Swannell - cover photography

References

External links 

Stackridge albums
1976 albums
The Rocket Record Company albums